HD 165189 and HD 165190 are components of a visual binary star system located 145 light years away in the southern constellation of Corona Australis. The system is a member of the Beta Pictoris Moving Group.

The pair orbit each other with a period of 450 years and a large eccentricity of 0.650. Both components are A-type main-sequence stars; the primary has a stellar classification of A6 V while the secondary is A7 V. They have similar masses of 1.59 and 1.58 times the mass of the Sun, respectively.

References

A-type main-sequence stars
Beta Pictoris moving group
Corona Australis
Durchmusterung objects
088726
165189
Binary stars
Coronae Australis, 1